Cross Inn is a southerly district of the town of Llantrisant within Rhondda Cynon Taf, South Wales.  It is bounded by the B4595 to the north, the A4119 to the west, and the A473 to the south, near the Afon Clun.

Villages in Rhondda Cynon Taf